Ijeoma Josephina Otabor (born 2 June 1997) known as Phyna is a Nigerian actress, model, hype woman, entertainer and a reality TV star. She is the winner of  Big Brother Naija season 7.

Early life 
Phyna is from Esan tribe in Edo state but she was born in Lagos State. She grew up in Edo State where she had her primary and secondary education. She is a graduate of Engineering from Auchi Polytechnic.

Career 
Before entering the Big Brother Naija house, Phyna was a commercial model, who started her career from college and was signed  by a modelling agency.

Big Brother Naija 
Phyna entered the 7th season of Big Brother Naija (Level Up) as the tenth housemate on 23 July 2022.

During the season finale of the show on 2 October 2022, she was declared the winner scoring 40.74% of the final votes ahead of Bryann with 26.74% of the total votes cast and was entitled to the ₦100 000 000 (one hundred million naira) grand prize, making her the second female to win the show, three years after Mercy Eke won it.

Endorsements 
Rixariskinskinscrets,
Speedy weightloss

Filmography

Television

References 

Living people
Big Brother (franchise) winners
Participants in Nigerian reality television series
People from Edo State
1997 births